Michal Kosinski is a Professor at Stanford University, a computational psychologist, and a psychometrician. He studies humans in a digital environment using computational methods, AI and Big Data.

He has co-authored the textbook Modern Psychometrics and published over 90 peer-reviewed papers in journals including Scientific Reports, Proceedings of the National Academy of Sciences, Psychological Science, Journal of Personality and Social Psychology, and Machine Learning, that have been cited over 17,000 times according to Google Scholar.

He is among the top 1% of Highly Cited Researchers according to Clarivate. His research inspired a cover of The Economist, a 2014 theatre play "Privacy", multiple TED talks, a video game, and was discussed in thousands of books, press articles, podcasts, and documentaries. Kosinski was behind the first press article warning against Cambridge Analytica published in The Guardian. His research exposed the privacy risks that they have exploited and measured the efficiency of their methods.

Kosinski appeared in the film Do You Trust This Computer alongside Elon Musk and Ray Kurzweil.

Education 
Kosinski holds a doctorate in psychology from the University of Cambridge and master's degrees in psychometrics and in social psychology. He used to work as a post-doctoral scholar at Stanford's Computer Science Department, as the Deputy Director of the University of Cambridge Psychometrics Centre before that, and as a researcher at Microsoft Research (Machine Learning Group).

Research 

In 2013, Michal Kosinski and David Stillwell published a paper entitled "Private Traits and Attributes Are Predictable from Digital Records of Human Behavior". Kosinski and his co-authors claimed that by studying someone's Facebook Likes, one could figure out personal traits and sensitive attributes they may not want to share, from sexual and political orientation to mental health. "Individual traits and attributes can be predicted to a high degree of accuracy based on records of users' Likes," they wrote.

Kosinski and Stillwell would improve their prediction methods and publish a paper that claimed that using Facebook Likes alone, a researcher could know someone better than their close friends or life partner. In 2012, Facebook had actually patented a method doing precisely what Kosinski and Stillwell did, "Determining user personality characteristics from social networking system communications and characteristics".

Two weeks after Kosinski and Stillwell's paper was published, Facebook changed the default settings on Likes so that only friends could see them (until then, they were by default visible to anyone on the internet) unless people chose to share more widely. The exception was for Facebook itself, which saw everyone's Likes and could keep using them for targeting, ranking, selecting versions of products, and various other purposes.

In 2017, Kosinski co-published a paper showing that modern Artificial Intelligence can predict someone's sexual orientation based on facial images. The research was conducted on over 130,000 pictures and used existing facial recognition systems and AI algorithm. Their AI could predict the sexual orientation of a gay men 81% of the time, while a human would be right 61% of the time). This research raised controversy although Kosinski and his co-author claimed they conducted it as a demonstration of the power of machine vision, to warn policy makers and to raise the alarm around the inevitable erosion of privacy.

See also 

 Ethics of artificial intelligence
 AI takeover
 Privacy

References

External links 
 Michal Kosinski, With big data comes big responsibility, „Financial Times", 2013
 Michal Kosinski's website Michal Kosinski, PhD - Curriculum Vitae
 The End of Privacy, The End of Privacy | Michal Kosinski | Talks at Google

Living people
1982 births